Vipera Sapiens is an EP by Brazilian heavy metal band Viper. It was released under the name Viper Brazil.

Track listing
 "Acid Heart" — 3:16
 "Silent Enemy" — 3:58
 "Crime" — 4:06
 "Wasted Again" — 3:21
 "Killing World" — 3:08
 "The Spreading Soul (acoustic version)" — 4:50

Personnel
Pit Passarell - vocals, bass guitar
Yves Passarell - guitars
Felipe Machado - guitars
Renato Graccia - drums

Additional musicians:
 Sascha Paeth - backing vocal
 Thomas Rettke - backing vocal

External links
 Viper official site
 Vipera Sapiens lyrics

1992 EPs
Viper (band) albums
Massacre Records EPs
Albums produced by Charlie Bauerfeind